Geiser Manufacturing Company was an early manufacturing company in Waynesboro, Pennsylvania. Geiser Manufacturing was incorporated in 1869 by Peter and Daniel Geiser. The company built grain separators, threshers, plows, and steam traction engines. The company's brand name was Peerless. The main building was 334 ft long and 3 stories in height, and had a 34 ft cupola. In January 1891 its total monthly payroll amounted to over 10,000 US dollars ($239500 in 2010 dollars) and employed 162 people.

In 1899 the company expanded outside Waynesboro and bought the Crowell industrial park in Greencastle, Pennsylvania, and began producing its Geiser's first gasoline engines there. Up to this point, all its products had been steam-powered.

In March 1912, Geiser's Waynesboro plant was hit by a strike involving over a thousand employees after "a new superintendent had new ideas concerning the manner in which the place should be run." Other plants were not affected by the dispute.

In 1912 Geiser Manufacturing was purchased by the Emerson-Brantingham Company of Rockford, Illinois, which had gone so far in August 1912 as to issue over 22 million dollars ($490 million in 2010 dollars) in stock in order to raise the capital to purchase the company along with Reeves & Co of Columbus, Indiana and Gas Traction Company of Minneapolis.  In 1936 Geiser became bankrupt and was forced to sell everything.   On August 21, 1940 while removing equipment, a fire leveled the plant which was thought to have been started by a welders torch. It had been said the glow of the fire could be seen from almost forty miles away. Currently, only the main office building stands, and the main property is now occupied by a funeral home, parking lot, NAPA Auto Parts Store, Bowersox Memorial Stone's and church as well as a post office, .

References

Defunct motor vehicle manufacturers of the United States
Agricultural machinery manufacturers of the United States
Defunct manufacturing companies based in Pennsylvania